The 1st Bangladesh National Film Awards presented by Ministry of Information to felicitate the best of Bangladeshi Cinema censored in the year 1975. Every year, a national panel appointed by the government selects the winning entry and awards were given by then President of Bangladesh. It was the first ceremony of National Film Awards and presented on 4 April 1976. Director Zahir Raihan was awarded a special awards.

List of winners
This year awards were given in total 12 categories out of 19 categories.

Merit awards

Technical awards

Special Award
 Zahir Raihan (Posthumous)

Multiple awards
The following films received multiple awards:

See also
 Bachsas Awards
 Meril Prothom Alo Awards
 Ifad Film Club Award
 Babisas Award

References

External links

National Film Awards (Bangladesh) ceremonies
Bangladesh National Film Awards
National Film Awardsh
National Film Awards
1970s in Dhaka